The Roman Catholic Diocese of Cornélio Procópio is a diocese located in the city of Cornélio Procópio in the Ecclesiastical province of Londrina in Brazil.

History
 May 26, 1973: Established as Diocese of Cornélio Procópio from the Diocese of Jacarezinho

Bishops
 Bishops of Cornélio Procópio (Roman rite), in reverse chronological order
 Bishop Marcos José dos Santos (2022.06.22 – present)
 Bishop Manoel João Francisco (2014.03.26 – 2022.06.22)
 Bishop Getúlio Teixeira Guimarães, S.V.D. (1984.03.26 – 2014.03.26)
 Bishop Domingos Gabriel Wisniewski, C.M. (1979.04.19 – 1983.05.17)
 Bishop José Joaquim Gonçalves (1973.06.14 – 1979.03.28)

Other priests of this diocese who became bishops
Sérgio de Deus Borges, appointed Auxiliary Bishop of São Paulo in 2012
Aparecido Donizete de Souza, appointed Auxiliary Bishop of Porto Alegre, Rio Grande do Sul in 2015

References
 GCatholic.org
 Catholic Hierarchy

Roman Catholic dioceses in Brazil
Christian organizations established in 1973
Cornélio Procópio, Roman Catholic Diocese of
Roman Catholic dioceses and prelatures established in the 20th century
Cornélio Procópio